This page seeks to list and compare hardware devices that are shipped with Microsoft's Windows Phone 7 operating system. HTC Corporation, Samsung, LG, Dell, Fujitsu, Nokia, Acer, Alcatel and ZTE have all released Windows Phone-based devices.

Throughout its lifespan, Windows Phone 7 was shipped on 28 unique devices. This list contains devices that have been confirmed and officially announced by their manufacturers.

Released

Windows Phone 7.0 
First generation devices come with Windows Phone 7 preinstalled and can be updated to Windows Phone 7.5 and 7.8 OS.  All devices in this list feature a 1 GHz Scorpion single-core processor, 512 MB of RAM, a 480 x 800 WVGA resolution screen, a back camera of 5 megapixels and a built-in digital compass. The chipset used is the Snapdragon S1 QSD8250 on non-LG devices and the Snapdragon S1 QSD8650 on LG devices. There are two exceptions, however; the Dell Venue Pro does not feature a compass, while the HTC 7 Mozart includes an 8 MP back camera instead of 5 MP.

Windows Phone 7.5
Second generation Windows Phone comes pre-installed with the Windows Phone 7.5 "Mango" version of Windows Phone or later. All devices in this list feature a single-core processor, a 480 x 800 WVGA resolution screen, and (except for the HTC Radar) a built-in digital compass. Due to the change of requirements, some second generation devices have lower-speed processors or less than 512 MB of RAM.

Windows Phone 7.8 
Third generation Windows Phone 7.8 update was announced by Microsoft as an alternative to Windows Phone 8. Existing 7.5 devices cannot be updated to WP8. Only two Windows Phone 7.8 device was announced.

References

 
Technology-related lists
Lists of mobile phones